Zi Wei Dou Shu, commonly referred to in English as Purple Star Astrology, is a form of fortune-telling in Chinese culture. The study of destiny (Chinese: , ming xue) is one of the five arts of Chinese metaphysics. Along with the Bazi chart, Zi Wei Dou Shu is one of the most renowned fortune-telling methods used in this study. Much like western astrology, Zi Wei Dou Shu claims to use the position of the cosmos at the time of one's birth to make determinations about personality, career and marriage prospects, and more.

History 
Traditionally, Zi Wei Dou Shu is considered to have been created by a Taoist named Lu Chun Yang during the Tang Dynasty.  It was further developed by Chen Xi Yi during the Song Dynasty and later on by Luo Hong Xian during the Ming Dynasty to its present-day form. Its exact origin, however, is still debated among different schools.

Unlike the more commonly known Four Pillars of Destiny system of birth-chart divination, Zi Wei Dou Shu is based on a purely lunar calendar and the position of the night sky. By contrast, Bazi is tied to the sexagenary cycle system of timekeeping, which is often mapped to traditional Chinese solar terms. Some believe that this difference makes the two systems complementary rather than competitors.

The study of destiny (ming xue), of which Zi Wei Dou Shu is a part, has traditionally been closely intertwined with astronomy. Historically, gifted astronomers and astrologers were recruited as officials to work in Imperial Courts during the dynastic eras, producing astrological charts for the emperor, as his personal fate had a direct bearing on his kingdom. The court astrologers also played an important role in determining the successor to the throne.

Astrologers observed the stars and noticed that among so many stars, only one was seemingly stationary while the rest revolved around it. This star was named the "Emperor Star"--the celestial equivalent of the Emperor and known in the West as Polaris. While this star in Zi Wei Dou Shu has a physical basis, the rest of the system's 'stars' are expressions of the cyclical passage of time and do not necessarily represent physical stars in the sky.

As with many other forms of fortune-telling, practitioners do not generally see the natal chart as an infallible guide as to what will happen, but more as a form of forecasting in detail. Destiny and fortune are considered structurally complex and are unlikely to be changed by a single element. An overly simplistic application of - for example - changing one's lucky colors and numbers is not expected to affect or change one's destiny in any significant way. However, practitioners believe that knowledge about future possibilities may allow one to gauge the situation in advance and make decisions from a position of strength. Zi Wei Dou Shu approaches the world and events from the idea that to view things in their proper context, it is important to recognise the "spiritual dynamic of the universe" to find the pattern of change that leads to "fundamental truth".

Etymology 
 Zi Wei - purple rose. The term is also used to refer to the North Star, the most prominent star in the sky.
 Dou - star.
 Shu - calculation.

Zi Wei Dou Shu Chart Structure

The 12 Palaces, or Shí Èr Gōng are arranged and plotted in an anti-clockwise rotation. The presence of certain stars in each palace can be considered either an auspicious or inauspicious omen regarding that part of one's life. In some lineages, these palaces are also assigned phases based on the sexagenary cycle which is also used in Bazi reading.

 Self Palace
 Siblings Palace
 Spouse Palace
 Children Palace
 Wealth Palace
 Health Palace
 Travel Palace
 Friends Palace, or Subordinate Palace
 Career Palace
 Property Palace
 Mental Palace, or Karma Palace, Ancestor Palace
 Parents Palace

The 14 Major Stars 
Different schools ascribe importance to the presence and strength of many different 'stars', ranging from 18 to dozens, often including interactions and transformations between these stars. However, 14 "major" stars are used consistently across different lineages:

 Zi Wei 紫微(The Emperor Star or The Purple Star): associated with Yin Earth, the leader - organizator, the senior, the monarch, stable development, benevolence, neutrality, wisdom, obligations, human society, power,　position, material wealth, the capacity of healing and rescuing.
 Tian Ji 天機(The Smart Star or Heavenly Secret): associated with Yin Wood, the assistant, the strategist, the clerk, siblings, intelligence, strategy, manipulation, goodness. 
 Tai Yang 太陽(The Sun): associated with Yang Fire, the leader of men, the senior, the male (father-husband-son), the mass, mass development, masculine characteristics, directness, vision, self-sacrifice, universal love, ideal, nature, power, fame, the capacity of giving.
 Wu Qu 武曲(The Finance Star): associated with Yin Metal, the assistant, the short term planner, the merchant, the worker, the lonely, craftiness, inner strength, caution, rigidity, decisiveness, wealth, industry.
 Tian Fu 天府(The Treasury Star): associated with Yang Earth, the senior, the monarch or high official, background leadership, stability, benevolence, conservativeness, human society, material wealth, position, power, the capacity of consolidating.
 Tian Tong 天同(The Caring Star):  associated with Yang Water, the junior, mercuriality, natural kindness, pleasure, laziness, good fortune
 Lian Zhen 廉貞(The Upright Star):  associated with Yin Fire, the virgin, the judge, the lawyer, the witch, the courtesan, strictness, chastity, wickedness, double-facedness, prison, harem, justice, abominable accidents, punishment, love, humour, poverty
 Tai Yin 太陰(The Moon): associated with Yin Water, the female or feminine leader, the manipulator, the senior, the female (mother-wife-daughter), inner or passive development, retrospective development, feminine characteristics, subtlety, feminine or maternal love, maternal sacrifice, selfishness, extravagance, ideal, arts, nature, material wealth, real estate, cleanness, the capacity of receiving and spending.
 Tan Lang 貪狼(The Flirting Star): associated with Yang Wood and Yin Water, the hunter, extravagant people, the priest, sex, deviousness, libido, selfish desires, riskiness, prison
 Ju Men 巨門(The Gloomy Star): associated with Yin  Water, the lawyer, the parliament, singers, quarrel, betrayal, notoriety, frankness, secret, bad luck, prison
 Tian Xiang 天相(The Minister Star): associated with Yang Water, the high-ranked assistant, delegates or representatives, high offices, benevolence, generosity, stability, loyalty
 Tian Liang 天梁(The Blessing Star): associated with Yang Earth and Yang Wood, the teacher, the scholar, the rules, benevolence, generosity, toleration, forgiveness, education, wisdom
 Qi Sha 七殺(The Power Star):  associated with Yin Metal and Yang Fire, the military leader, quick temper, heroicism, directness, pain and labour, danger, loyalty, exception
 Po Jun 破軍(The Ruinous Star):  associated with Yin Water, military leaders, betrayal, craftiness, waste, destruction, changes

References 
 Kong Ri Chang. (2004). . Publisher:  (Taiwan). 
 Xie Tian Quan. (2002).  Publisher:  (Hong Kong).

Notes

Chinese astrology
Divination
Asian culture
Taoist divination